Ciampino is a city and comune in the Metropolitan City of Rome, Lazio, Italy. It was a frazione of Marino until 1974, when it became a comune; it obtained the city status (being therefore officially known as Città di Ciampino) in 2004 by a presidential decree.

It is best known for the local "Giovan Battista Pastine" International Airport, best known as Rome Ciampino, a military airport  which also hosts several civil flights, especially from low-cost companies such as Ryanair. The city is named after Giovanni Giustino Ciampini, a religious, scientist and archaeologist who lived here in the 17th century. It grew from 5,000 inhabitants in 1951 to 28,000 in 1971. Today, the city has circa 38,700 inhabitants.

Climate
According to the Köppen Climate Classification system, Ciampino has a warm-summer Mediterranean climate, abbreviated "Csa" on climate maps.

Sports
A.S.D. Polisportiva Ciampino and Polisportiva Città di Ciampino (Pol.D. Città di Ciampino) were the football clubs of the city. The first team of Città di Ciampino withdrew from Eccellenza Lazio in 2018, focusing on youth sector.

In the past, the city had another club, Associazione Polisportiva Dilettantistica Ciampino, which was folded in 2014 by selling its position in the league to A.S.D. Trastevere Calcio.

References

External links
  

Cities and towns in Lazio
Castelli Romani